The Ligier JS33 was a Formula One car used by the Ligier team during the 1989 Formula One season.  Its best finish in a race was fifth, at the 1989 Canadian Grand Prix.  The JS33 was updated to a 'B' spec for use in the following season, but failed to score any points for the team.

Development
For the 1989 season, Ligier switched from the Judd engines of the previous season to Cosworth DFR.  The JS33 chassis was designed by Michel Beaujon and finished off by Richard Divila.  In appearance, it looked similar to the March 881 and even used the same gearbox (purchased from March).

The chassis was updated to a 'B' spec for the 1990 Formula One season.  The March gearbox from the previous season was discarded in favour of an X-trac unit, and the front suspension was revised.  Weight was also shaved from the car.

Race history

1989 season
Ligier's lead driver from the previous season, René Arnoux, remained with the team and alongside him was new recruit Olivier Grouillard.  Arnoux, in his final season in Formula One, did not start the year well, failing to qualify for the first two races of the year before making the grid in the Monaco Grand Prix in 21st spot.  He went on to finish the race in 12th.  He continued to struggle during qualifying, only making the grid on eight more occasions.  He finished in the points once, with a fifth-place finish at the Canadian Grand Prix.

Grouillard was usually the faster of the two Ligier drivers.  His best qualification performance was at the San Marino Grand Prix where he was 10th on the grid.  He was disqualified from the race after his team worked on his car prior to a restart of the race.  His best finish of the year was 6th, at the French Grand Prix.  Grouillard left the team at the end of the season.  Ligier finished 13th equal in the World Constructors' Championship with three points, an improvement on the previous year.

1990 season
Nicola Larini and Philippe Alliot were Ligier's drivers for the 1990 Formula One season.  Larini was a reliable driver for the team, finishing all but three of his races.  He did not score any points and his best finishes were back to back seventh places at the Spanish and Japanese Grand Prix.  Alliot had some unfortunate races; he was excluded from the opening race in the United States when a mechanic worked on his car outside of the pits and he was disqualified from the German Grand Prix when he received a push start on the first lap of the race.

With more cars than spaces available on the grid, some teams had to enter pre-qualifying in order to be allowed to participate in qualifying proper.  With neither driver scoring points by the midpoint of the season, Ligier was relegated to having to pre-qualify from the German Grand Prix.  However, this only lasted for a few races before one of the seeded teams, Onyx, withdrew from Formula One, allowing Ligier, as the best placed unseeded team, direct entry into qualifying.

Complete Formula One results
(key) (results in bold indicate pole position; results in italics indicate fastest lap)

Notes

References
 
 
 

1989 Formula One season cars
1990 Formula One season cars
Ligier Formula One cars